André Gillet (3 November 1916 – 29 June 1993) was a Canadian businessman and politician. Gillet was a Progressive Conservative party member of the House of Commons of Canada. He was an administrator, builder and contractor by career.

He was first elected at the Mercier riding in the 1958 general election. After serving his only federal term, the 24th Canadian Parliament, he was defeated at Mercier by Prosper Boulanger of the Liberal Party in the 1962 election. Gillet's further attempts to unseat Boulanger in the 1963 and 1965 elections were likewise unsuccessful.

External links
 

1916 births
1993 deaths
Members of the House of Commons of Canada from Quebec
Progressive Conservative Party of Canada MPs